The following is a historical events of Addis Ababa, the capital of Ethiopia, including its formation prior to 20th century by chronology.

Prior to 20th century

 15th-century – "Barara" was identified as possible location of the city
 1450 – Italian cartographer, Fra Mauro depicted the city standing between Mounts Zikwala and Menegasha
 1529 —  Ethiopian-Adal War, the Adal Sultanate entirely sacked the city under general Ahmad ibn Ibrahim al-Ghazi .
 1884 – Mount Entoto was founded by Negus and later Emperor Menelik II
 1886 — The city's former name called Finfinne renamed "Addis Ababa" ("New Flower") by Taytu Betul, Empress Consort of the Ethiopian Empire.
 1889 — Population: 15,000 (estimate).
 1891 — Ethiopian Empire capital relocated to Addis Ababa from Entoto (approximate date).
 1896 — St. George's Cathedral built.
 1897
 Harar-Addis telephone line constructed.
 Hospital opens.

20th century

 1903 — Eucalyptus trees planted.
 1904
 Mint established.
 Asmara — Addis telephone line constructed.
 1906 — Telegraph office and Menelik II school established.
 1907
 Ras Makonnen bridge constructed.
 Itegue Taitu Hotel in business.
 1908 — Tefere Makonnen high school established.
 1913 — Courrier d'Ethiopie newspaper begins publication.
 1917 — Djibouti-Addis Ababa railway begins operating.
 1922
 Nasibu Emmanual becomes mayor.
 Leprosy hospital built.
 1924 — Medhane Alem school established.
 1928 — Empress Menen school established.

1930s–1940s
 1930
 2 November: Haile Sellasie crowned "King of Kings of Ethiopia."
 Guenete Leul Palace built.
 Population: 80,000 (estimate).
 1935 — Hager Fikir Association formed.
 1936
 April: Aerial bombing by Italian forces.
 5 May: City taken by Italian forces.
 City becomes capital of Italian East Africa.
 Giuseppe Bottai becomes governor, succeeded by Alfredo Siniscalchi.
 1937
 19 February - Attempted assassination of Rodolfo Graziani at Viceregal Palace.
 19–20 February: Crackdown by Italian forces on Ethiopian population.
 1938 — Francesco Camero Medici becomes governor.
 1939 — Enrico Cerulli becomes governor, succeeded by Guglielmo Nasi.
 1940
 Giuseppe Daodice becomes governor.
 Hailé Sélassié Stadium opens.
 1941
 Agenore Frangipani becomes governor.
 5 May: Haile Selassie returns.
 Addis Zemen Amharic-language newspaper begins publication.
 1942 — Holy Trinity Cathedral built.
 1943 — Haile Selassie I school established.
 1944 — Public library inaugurated.
 1945 — Anbessa City Bus Service founded.
 1947 — Addis Ababa Chamber of Commerce founded.

1950s–1960s
 1950 — University College of Addis Ababa established.
 1952 — Prince Makonnen school established.
 1955 — Jubilee Palace and Haile Sellasie I Theatre built.
 1958
 Institute of Archaeology founded.
 Economic Commission for Africa headquartered in city.
 1960
 December: Coup attempt.
 Koka Dam constructed.
 1961
 Bole Airport established.
 United Nations Economic Commission for Africa headquartered in Addis Ababa.
 1963
 Organization of African Unity headquartered in Addis Ababa.
 Orchestra Ethiopia, Addis Ababa Bank, and Addis Ababa University's Institute of Ethiopian Studies established.
 1965
 Council of the Oriental Orthodox Churches held.
 Population: 560,000.
 1966
 Centre International de Developpement et de Recherche and Ethiopian Wildlife and Natural History Society headquartered in Addis Ababa.
 University Students' Union of Addis Ababa established.

1970s–1980s
 1974
 February: Demonstrations.
 Addis Ababa Fistula Hospital in operation.
 1975
 Population: 1,161,267.
 Kebeles established.
 1977
 February: Coup at Menelik Palace.
 Alemu Abebe becomes mayor.
 1984
 Addis Ababa Museum established.
 Population: 1,412,575.
 1987 — City becomes capital of People's Democratic Republic of Ethiopia.

1990s
 1991
 Finfinne become the capital city of the Oromia Region.
 City taken by Ethiopian People's Revolutionary Democratic Front.
An ammunition warehouse explodes, killing 100
 Ethiopian Economic Association headquartered in Addis Ababa.
 1992 — Ethiopian International Institute for Peace and Development headquartered in Addis Ababa.
 1994
 Theological College of the Holy Trinity re-opens.
 Population: 2,112,737.
 1995
 Addis Ababa "given the status of self-governed city."
 The Reporter newspaper begins publication.
 1996
 Addis Chamber International Trade Fair begins (approximate date).
 Goshu Art Gallery and Asni Gallery founded.
 1998 — Addis Ababa Ring Road construction begins.
 1999
 Mojo-Addis Ababa highway constructed.
 Ethiopian National Archives and Library established.
 2000
 City administrative areas reorganized into 10 sub-cities: Arada, Addis Ketema, Akaki Kalati, Bole, Cherkos, Gulele, Kolfe Keranio, Lideta, Nefas Silk, and Yeka.
 Oromia's capital relocated from Finfinne to Adama.
 Addis Ababa Women Entrepreneurs Association and Universal Arts and Crafts gallery established.
 November: Burial of Haile Selassie.

21st century

2000s

 2001 — City plan adopted.
 2002
 African Union headquartered in Addis Ababa.
 AIDS Resource Center launched.
 Population: 2,646,000.
 Bole Airport new terminal opens.
 2003 — Arkebe Oqubay becomes mayor.
 2004 — Ethiopian Orthodox Library-Museum inaugurated.
 2005 
 Oromia's capital restored to Addis Ababa
 Election protest.
 2006
 12 May: Bombings.
 Federation of African Societies of Chemistry headquartered in Addis Ababa.
 2007
 Addis International Film Festival begins.
 Dembel Mall built.
 2008
 Addis Ababa Women’s Affairs Bureau established.
 Kuma Demeksa becomes mayor.
 April–May: African Championships in Athletics held.
 2009 — Cinema Yoftahe opens.

2010s

 2011 — Jazzamba Lounge (nightclub) in business.
 2012
 Muslim protest.
 African Union Conference Center inaugurated.
 2013 — 2 June: Anti-government protest.
 2017  
Addis Ababa–Djibouti Railway in operation.
The Koshe landfill collapses, burying stick and brick houses, killing many people.
 Population: 4,215,965 (estimate).
 2018
 Takele Uma Benti becomes mayor.
 2020
 Adanech Abebe becomes a  Deputy mayor, being the first female mayor to hold a position.
2021
 Adanech Abebe reelected as a mayor
United Front of Ethiopian Federalist and Confederalist Forces groups close in on Addis Ababa and threaten to take it.

See also
 History of Addis Ababa

References

This article incorporates information from the German Wikipedia and the Italian Wikipedia.

Bibliography
Published in 19th-20th century
 
 
 
 
 
 
 
 
 

Published in 21st century

External links

   (Bibliography of open access  articles)
  (Images, etc.)
  (Images, etc.)
  (Images, etc.)
  (Bibliography)
  (Bibliography)
  (Bibliography)
 
 

Timeline
Addis Ababa
Addis Ababa
Years in Ethiopia
Addis Ababa